In technical communication, topic-based authoring is a modular approach to content creation where content is structured around topics that can be mixed and reused in different contexts. It is defined in contrast with book-oriented or narrative content, written in the linear structure of written books.

Topic-based authoring is popular in the technical publications and documentation arenas, as it is especially suitable for technical documentation. Tools supporting this approach typically store content in XHTML or other XML formats and support content reuse, management, and the dynamic assembly of personalized information.

A topic is a discrete piece of content that:
 focuses on one subject
 has an identifiable purpose
 does not require external context to understand

Topics can be written to be independent of one another and reused wherever needed.

The Darwin Information Typing Architecture is a standard designed to help authors create topic-based structured content. The standard is managed by the Organization for the Advancement of Structured Information Standards DITA Technical Committee.

See also
 Component content management system
 Structured writing
 Topic based authoring in Simplified Technical English

References

External links
 DITA Users a member organization helping people get started with topic-based structured writing
 OASIS DITA Focus Area the official OASIS DITA community

Technical communication